This is a list of programs broadcast by Disney Channel (France). It does not include Disney XD, Disney Junior, Disney Cinemagic, Toon Disney,  Gulli, Jetix, or Playhouse Disney programs. Only one TF1 Program Exist

Current programming

Original programming

 A Table les enfants
 Bande De Sportifs
 Best Bugs Forever  (Bestioles Motel)
 Chez Rémy Tout le Monde Peut Cuisiner
 Disney Channel Talents
 En Route Champion!
 Like Me
 LoliRock
 Mère et Fille
 Miraculous: Tales of Ladybug & Cat Noir (Miraculous, les aventures de Ladybug et Chat Noir)
 Rolling with the Ronks! (Bienvennue chez les Ronks!)
Sadie Sparks
 The Unstoppable Yellow Yeti (L’Incroyable Yellow Yeti)

Live-actionn series (from Disney Channel US)
 Bia 
 Bunk'd (Camp Kikiwaka)
 Find Me in Paris (Lena, Reve d'etoile)
  Gabby Duran and the Unsittables (Gabby Duran, baby-sitter d'extraterrestres)
 Just Roll with It (Une famille impredictabllè)
 Raven's Home (Raven)
 Sydney to the Max (Sidney au Max)
 Secrets of Sulphur Springs (Les Secrets de Sulphur Springs)
 Violetta Ultra Violet & Black Scorpion The Villains of Valley View (Les Super-Vilains de Valley View)Animatedn series (from Disney Channel US)101 Dalmatian Street (101, rue des Dalmatiens)AmphibiaBig City Greens (Les Green à Big City)Big Hero 6 (Baymax et les Nouveax Heròs)Carmen SandiegoDuckTales (La Bande à Piscou)Elena of Avalor (Elena d'Avalor)Go Away, Unicorn! (Va-ten Licorne!)Gravity Falls (Souvenirs de Gravity Falls)Hotel Transylvania (Hôtel Transylvaniè - La Serie)
 Hamster & Gretel (Hamster et Gretel)Legend of the Three Caballeros (La Legende de Trois Caballeros)Milo Murphy's Law (La Loi de Milo Murphy)Mia and Me (Mia et Moi)
 Moon Girl and Devil Dinosaur (Moon Girl et Devil le dinosaure)Phineas and Ferb (Phineas et Ferb)Pat the Dog (Paf, le chien)She-Ra and the Princesses of Power (She-ra et les Princesses au Pouvoir)Tangled: The Series (Raiponce, la série)The Owl House (Luz à Osville)The Ghost and Molly McGee (Molly McGee et le fantôme)
 Viking SkoolW.I.T.C.H  (Dimension W.I.T.C.H)

Disney JuniorArt AttackDoc McStuffins (Docteur La Peluche)Fancy Nancy (Nancy fantaisie)Gigantosaurus (Gigantosaure)Goldie and Bear (Goldie et l'ours)Handy Manny (Manny et ses outils)Jake and the Never Land Pirates (Jake et les pirates du Pays imaginaire)Luo Bao Bei (Luo Bao Bei)
 Miles from Tomorrowland (Miles dans l'espace)Octonauts (Les Octonauts)Sofia the First (Princesse Sofia)Special Agent Oso (Agent spécial Oso)
 Sheriff Callie's Wild West (Shérif Callie au Far West)
 The Lion Guard (La Garde du Roi Lion)Vampirina (Vampirina)

Former programming
 Andi Mack (Andi)
 Archie's Weird Mysteries (Archie, Mystères et Compagnie)
 Alex & Co Austin & Ally (Austin et Ally)
 Backstage Best Friends Whenever (English language only)
 Gamer's Guide to Pretty Much Everything (Guide de survie d'un gamer) 
 Girl Meets World (Le Monde De Riley)
 Good Luck Charlie (Bonne Chance Charlie)
 EvermoorFriends: Girls on a Mission (Friends: Cinq Filles en Mission)
 Hannah Montana (English language only)
 Horrid Henry (Lucas la Cata/Lucas le Cata)
 Jessie 
 K.C. Undercover (Agent K.C.)
 Kid vs. Kat
 Kirby Buckets (Also on Disney XD)
 Lab Rats (Les Bio-Teens)
 Life with Derek (Derek)
 Liv and Maddie (Liv et Maddie)
 Mermaid Melody Pichi Pichi Pitch
 Mónica Chef (Monica Chef)
 The Next Step (The Next Step : Le Studio)
 Rekkit Rabbit (Rekkit)
 Sabrina: The Animated Series (Sabrina, Apprentie Sorcière)
 Sabrina's Secret Life (Le Secret de Sabrina)
 Sonny with a Chance (Sonny)
 Soy Luna
 Stargate Infinity (Stargate: Le Dessin Animé)
 Stuck in the Middle (Harley, le Cadet de mes Soucis)
 The Suite Life of Zack & Cody (La Vie de palace de Zack et Cody)
 The Suite Life on Deck (La vie de croisière de Zack et Cody)
 That's So Raven (Phénomène Raven)
 Wakfu: The Animated Series (Wakfu La Serié)
 Winx Club
 Wizards of Waverly Place (Les Sorciers de Waverly Place)
 Wolfblood (Wolfblood : le secret des loups)
 Zig and Sharko (Zig et Sharko)

References

External links
Official site

Disney Channel
Disney Channel related-lists